Jack Manning may refer to:

Jack Manning (actor) (1916–2009), American film, stage and television actor
Jack Manning (architect) (1929–2021), New Zealand architect
Jack Manning (baseball) (1853–1929), American baseball player
Jack Manning (cricketer) (1923–1988), Australian cricketer
Jack Manning (footballer) (1886–1946), English footballer

Others
Jack Manning (One Life to Live), fictional character on the American soap opera One Life to Live

See also
John Manning (disambiguation)